Jhonatan Esquivel, (Born October 13, 1988) is a Uruguayan rower.

Olympic Games
Jhonatan attended the 2016 Olympic Games, representing Uruguay in the men's single sculls.

References

1988 births
Living people
Rowers at the 2016 Summer Olympics
Olympic rowers of Uruguay
South American Games silver medalists for Uruguay
South American Games bronze medalists for Uruguay
South American Games medalists in rowing
Uruguayan male rowers
Competitors at the 2010 South American Games
21st-century Uruguayan people